No Sung-Ho (born October 22, 1989 in Incheon) is a South Korean pitcher who plays for the Samsung Lions in the Korea Baseball Organization. He bats and throws left-handed.

Amateur career
No attended Hwasun High School in Jeollanam-do. After being undrafted out of high school, he continued to play baseball at Dongguk University. As a freshman in  No led his team to the national championship at the 42nd President's Flag National Collegiate Championship, earning tournament MVP honors.

No was called up to the South Korean national baseball team during his sophomore and junior seasons, and competed in the 2009 Baseball World Cup and 2010 World University Baseball Championship.

He helped his team win the KBO's Flag National Collegiate Championship, and was named MVP and best pitcher of the tournament.

Notable international careers

Professional career

In the  KBO Draft, Lee was selected by the NC Dinos as the first overall pick, along with Lee Min-Ho. During the 2012 season in the Futures League, he showed enough promise to be placed on the Dinos' starting rotation for their inaugural KBO season in 2013, going 6–2 with a 3.36 ERA and 79 strikeouts in 75 innings pitched.

No made his KBO league debut against the Samsung Lions on April 5, 2013, as a starting pitcher. He threw 53 pitches and allowed five earned runs in only one inning pitched in a 10–4 loss. After the game he was sent to the bullpen but never fully recovered, posting a +10.00 ERA through the first two months of the season. At the end of May, No was demoted to the Dinos' second-tier team in the KBO Futures League. No was called up to the first team again in late June and appeared in eight games as a relief pitcher before he made his second start for the Dinos on July 26, giving up three runs in five innings.

External links 
 Korea Baseball Organization career statistics from Koreabaseball.com
 

South Korean baseball players
NC Dinos players
Samsung Lions players
Dongguk University alumni
Gyoha No clan
1989 births
Living people
Sportspeople from Incheon